Rijat Shala (Serbo-Croat: Rijat Šala; born 26 July 1983 in Prizren, Yugoslavia) is a Swiss footballer of Kosovar Albanian descent who most recently played for Swiss lower league club AS Breganzona.

Club career
He spent the 2007–08 season with Serie A side Cagliari, making his club debut on a Coppa Italia match that won 2–1 to A.C. Siena, on 29 August 2007. He however did not manage to gain a single first team appearance, being quickly relegated into the reserves, and in July 2008 Cagliari released him from the squad. He played for Lega Pro Prima Divisione club Taranto in 2008. In mid-2009 he left for Prima Divisione Novara, winning a successive promotion in 2010 (to Serie B) and in 2011 (Serie A). In the first Novara season, he only earned a gross annual salary of €76,900. He later played for KF Vllaznia Shkodër in the Albanian Superliga.

He employed Bruno Carpeggiani (of "Italian Managers Group srl.") as his agent on 12 December 2008 but unilaterally terminated the contract during 2009–10 season. In 2011 Tribunale Nazionale di Arbitrato per lo Sport of CONI awarded a decision that Shala had to pay Carpeggiani €3,845 as agent fee (€76,900 x 5%).

References

External links
La Gazzetta dello Sport profile (updated as of June 2008)
aic.football.it

1983 births
Living people
Sportspeople from Prizren
Kosovo Albanians
Kosovan emigrants to Switzerland
Swiss people of Albanian descent
Association football midfielders
Kosovan footballers
Swiss men's footballers
Switzerland under-21 international footballers
FC Lugano players
FC Schaffhausen players
Grasshopper Club Zürich players
U.S. Salernitana 1919 players
Calcio Foggia 1920 players
Cagliari Calcio players
Taranto F.C. 1927 players
Novara F.C. players
KF Teuta Durrës players
Amicale F.C. players
Swiss Super League players
Serie A players
Serie B players
Kategoria Superiore players
Swiss expatriate footballers
Kosovan expatriate footballers
Expatriate footballers in Italy
Swiss expatriate sportspeople in Italy
Kosovan expatriate sportspeople in Italy
Expatriate footballers in Albania
Kosovan expatriate sportspeople in Albania
Swiss expatriate sportspeople in Albania
Expatriate footballers in Vanuatu
Shala (tribe)